1665 Gaby, provisional designation , is a stony asteroid and a relatively slow rotator from the inner regions of the asteroid belt, approximately 11 kilometers in diameter. It was discovered on 27 February 1930, by German astronomer Karl Reinmuth at Heidelberg Observatory in southern Germany. It was later named after Gaby Reinmuth, the discoverer's daughter-in-law.

Orbit and classification 

Gaby orbits the Sun at a distance of 1.9–2.9 AU once every 3 years and 9 months (1,370 days). Its orbit has an eccentricity of 0.21 and an inclination of 11° with respect to the ecliptic. No precoveries were taken, and no prior identifications were made of Gaby. The body's observation arc begins 2 months after its official discovery observation at Heidelberg.

Physical characteristics 

In the Tholen classification, Gaby is a common S-type asteroid.

Lightcurves 

In February 2005, French amateur astronomer Laurent Bernasconi obtained a rotational lightcurve of Gaby from photometric observations. It gave a rotation period of 66 hours with a brightness variation of 0.27 magnitude.

This is a longer-than average rotation, since most minor planets have a period between 2 and 20 hours (see list). In 2016, concurring sidereal periods of 67.905 and 67.911 hours were obtained from modeled photometric observations derived from the Lowell Photometric Database and other sources.

Diameter and albedo 

According to the survey carried out by NASA's Wide-field Infrared Survey Explorer with its subsequent NEOWISE mission, Gaby measures between 10.75 and 11.01 kilometers in diameter, and its surface has an albedo between 0.253 and 0.278.

Naming 

This minor planet was named by the discoverer for his daughter-in-law, Gaby Reinmuth. The official  was published by the Minor Planet Center on 15 December 1968.

References

External links 
 Asteroid Lightcurve Database (LCDB), query form (info )
 Dictionary of Minor Planet Names, Google books
 Asteroids and comets rotation curves, CdR – Observatoire de Genève, Raoul Behrend
 Discovery Circumstances: Numbered Minor Planets (1)-(5000)  – Minor Planet Center
 
 

 

001665
Discoveries by Karl Wilhelm Reinmuth
Named minor planets
001665
19300227